Irina Brook (born 5 April 1962) is a Franco-British stage director, producer, and actress. She was named Chevalier des Arts et des Lettres in 2002 by the French Ministry of Culture. In May 2017 Brook was upgraded to Officier de l'ordre des Arts et Lettres and awarded the Légion d'honneur.

Personal life 
Brook was born in Paris to film and theatre director Peter Brook and actress Natasha Parry and grew up between England and France. Her family is of Lithuanian Jewish descent. She was educated at Bedales School and went to New York City to study drama with Stella Adler.

Career 
She played in several off-Broadway shows, including the lead in Irish Coffee. She returned to Paris to act in her father's production of The Cherry Orchard  followed by Molière's Dom Juan at the Bouffes du Nord. She then moved to London, where she appeared in films, TV (including an episode of Bergerac 'My Friend Charlie' in 1990) and theatre productions. Her film roles include The Girl in the Picture (1985), Underworld (1985), Captive (1986), Maschenka (1987) and The Fool (1990).  She also appeared as Michelle Réage in a 1989 episode of the British TV series Inspector Morse.

In 1996, Brook directed and produced her first show, Beast on the Moon by Richard Kalinoski, at the Battersea Arts Centre, London. She also directed Madame Klein by Nicholas Wright (Watford) and Shakespeare's All's Well That Ends Well (Oxford). In 1998, she directed the French version of Beast on the Moon at the Théâtre de Vidy-Lausanne and Bobigny, Paris. After several national and international tours, the show returned for a six-month sell-out at the Theâtre de l'Oeuvre, Paris, where it won five Molière theatre awards, including best director and best show. Brook also directed a television version of the play, for which she was awarded the prix Mitrani at the International Festival of Audiovisual Programs (FIPA), a film festival in Biarritz.

Brooks premiered a new American play, Resonance (Morphic Resonance), by Katherine Burger, at the Theâtre de l'Atelier, for which she also received a Molière award and the Société des Auteurs et Compositeurs Dramatiques award for new talent.

Brook produced a version of A Midsummer Night's Dream for six men, which was first produced by the Festival Dedans-Dehors, Brétigny-sur-Orge, and performed outdoors in France and Switzerland. The show toured Europe and Canada afterwards.

She was Director-in-Residence at Shakespeare & Company in Lenox, Massachusetts and currently working on a new production of the British classic Toad of Toad Hall. In 2012, she produced The Tempest by William Shakespeare and Peer Gynt by Henrik Ibsen at the Salzburg Festival.

Renaming her company Irina’s Dreamtheâtrè, she was invited to the Spoleto Festival in 2013 with a new creation: La Trilogie des Îles (The Islands Trilogy), consisting of Odyssey, The Tempest and Island of Slaves by Pierre de Marivaux. She and her company were awarded the Air France prize for innovative staging.

Brook became the artistic director of the Théatre National de Nice (TNN) in January 2014. There she directed a production of the Odyssey in June 2014 across gardens and museums in Nice, then in the TNN theatre, a production of Peer Gynt  in September 2014 (shown at the Barbican Centre, London, that October).

She ended her tenure at TNN with a production of Romeo and Juliet starring her daughter Maïa Jemmett.

Brook directed the opera The Magic Flute for the Dutch Reisopera, co-directed by her partner, Dan Jemmett.

References

External links

Living people
British theatre directors
Actresses from Paris
French stage actresses
French film actresses
French television actresses
French theatre directors
English stage actresses
English film actresses
English television actresses
Women theatre directors
Women arts administrators
Women theatre managers and producers
1962 births
French people of Jewish descent
British people of Latvian-Jewish descent
Brook family